A list of films produced in Argentina in 1966:

External links and references
 Argentine films of 1966 at the Internet Movie Database

1966
Films
Argentine